Victor Downtown Historical District is a  historic district encompassing several blocks of Victor, Colorado which was listed in the National Register of Historic Places in 1985.  The listing included 55 contributing buildings out of 66 buildings in total. The district is bounded roughly by Diamond Avenue, Second, Portland and Fifth Streets.

It includes:
Page Building (1899), 123 4th Street, a two-story brick commercial building
Assay Office/Rooming House (c.1899), 119-121 4th Street, a two-story brick commercial building with brick corbelling and a projecting cornice.
Gift Shop (1899), 415 Victor Avenue, a two-story, brick building with a plain boxed cornice and a paneled parapet
Boston Building (1900), 410 Victor Avenue, two-story brick commercial building.
 Midland Terminal Railroad Depot
 Stratton's Independence Mine and Mill
 Victor City Hall
 Victor Hotel
 Western Federation of Miners Union Hall

See also
Cripple Creek miners' strike of 1894
Colorado Labor Wars
National Register of Historic Places listings in Teller County, Colorado

References

Further reading
 

Commercial buildings on the National Register of Historic Places in Colorado
Romanesque Revival architecture in Colorado
Geography of Teller County, Colorado
Colorado Mining Boom
Historic districts on the National Register of Historic Places in Colorado
National Register of Historic Places in Teller County, Colorado